Power five or Power 5 may refer to:

 Fist bump, a social gesture
 Power Five conferences, the overall top five college football conferences
 POWER5, a microprocessor by IBM